Andorite is a sulfosalt mineral with the chemical formula PbAgSb3S6.

It was first described in 1892 for an occurrence in the Baia Sprie mine, Baia Sprie, in what is now Maramureș County, Romania, and named for Hungarian amateur mineralogist Andor von Semsey (1833–1923). Andorite occurs in low-temperature polymetallic hydrothermal veins. It occurs associated with stibnite, sphalerite, baryte, fluorite, siderite, cassiterite, arsenopyrite, stannite, zinkenite, tetrahedrite, pyrite, alunite, quartz, pyrargyrite, stephanite and rhodochrosite.

References

Silver minerals
Sulfosalt minerals
Orthorhombic minerals
Minerals in space group 33